The Tri-Services Guard of Honour (त्रि-सेवा सम्मान गार्ड) is an ad hoc infantry company of the Indian Armed Forces which is responsible for providing guards of honour for high ranking Indian and foreign officials. The company was created shortly after India gained its independence from the United Kingdom in 1947. It is headquartered in New Delhi and is composed of 100 men and women who are drawn from the three services of the Indian Armed Forces (Indian Army, Indian Navy and Indian Air Force). The guard excludes the Indian Coast Guard in any of its protocol events.

The company is deployed to the Rashtrapati Bhavan or the Secretariat Building only during the visits of Presidents, Prime Ministers, and Defense Ministers to India. Samman Guard is the march played by Indian military bands during inspections of guards of honour during state visits. On January 25, 2015, during President Barack Obama's state visit to India, Wing Commander Pooja Thakur made history by becoming the first female officer to lead the company during an arrival ceremony. It took part in the 2020 Moscow Victory Day Parade on Red Square.

Outside of India, a tri-services guard of honour may refer to an honour guard that includes the three main service branches of that country's military.

Gallery

See also
 India related
 Band of the Brigade of Gurkhas
 Beating retreat in India 
 Deshon Ka Sartaj Bharat
 Indian military bands
 Indian Army Chief's Band
 Military Music Wing
 Music of India
 President's Bodyguard
 Samman Guard

 Other related
 Guard of honour

References

Indian ceremonial units
Military units and formations of India
Military units and formations established in 1947
1947 establishments in India